A camping chair, or camp chair, is a lightweight folding chair with a canvas seat and backrest, which is suitable for use in temporary quarters, typically outdoor setting like camping on holiday, by being portable and easy to set up.

A camping stool is similar to a camping chair, but lacks back support.

Gallery

See also
 List of chairs
 Deckchair
 Backpack chair, a combination of a backpack and a chair, sometimes used for camping, hiking or short hunting trips

References

Folding chairs
History of furniture